Evo Peter Perini (February 10, 1928 – September 11, 2008) was an American football fullback who played two seasons in the National Football League with the Chicago Bears and Cleveland Browns. Born in the New Village section of Franklin Township, Warren County, New Jersey, he played at Washington High School, a predecessor to Warren Hills Regional High School. He played college football at Ohio State University.

Early years
Perini participated in high school football, baseball and wrestling at Washington High School. In football, he was a three-year letterman as a fullback and was a team captain in 1945. He earned First-team All-State honors in 1945. Perini was a four-year letterman and a four-time New Jersey state finalist in wrestling. He won the state championship in the 175 pound weight class in 1944 and in the heavyweight class in 1945. He also earned second place in the heavyweight class in 1946. In baseball, Perini earned four letters as a left fielder and pitcher. He was inducted into the Blue Streak Wall of Fame in 2001.

College career
Perini played football and baseball for the Ohio State Buckeyes from 1946 to 1950, earning four letters in each sport. In baseball, he became the only pitcher in school history to lead the team in wins and innings pitched in each of his four years as a starter. He had a career record of 30 wins and 13 losses. Perini set school records with a 1.45 earned run average his freshman year and a career ERA of 2.88. He was a punter and linebacker on the football team, helping the Buckeyes win the 1950 Rose Bowl. He was inducted into the Ohio State Athletics Hall of Fame in 2001.

Professional baseball career
Perini was drafted by the Boston Braves of Major League Baseball after his college career. He played for the Hagerstown Braves of the Interstate League as an outfielder from 1950 to 1951.

Professional football career
Perini played in fourteen games for the Chicago Bears from 1954 to 1955. He played in six games for the Cleveland Browns during the 1955 season. His career was cut short due to a knee injury.

Personal life
Perini served in the United States Army during the Korean War. He worked in the Ohio Department of Corrections for nearly three decades. He was also the superintendent of the Marion Correctional Institution until his retirement.

References

External links
Just Sports Stats
College stats

1928 births
2008 deaths
Players of American football from New Jersey
American football fullbacks
American football linebackers
American football punters
Ohio State Buckeyes football players
Ohio State Buckeyes baseball players
Chicago Bears players
Cleveland Browns players
Baseball pitchers
Baseball outfielders
Hagerstown Braves players
United States Army personnel of the Korean War
Sportspeople from Warren County, New Jersey